Riders of the Range is a 1923 American silent Western film presented by Clifford S. Efelt, directed by Otis B. Thayer, and starring Edmund Cobb, Dolly Dale, Helen Hayes and Frank Gallagher. The film was shot in  Colorado by Thayer's Art-O-Graf film company. It was a Roy M. Langdon Production. The film was released on VHS by Grapevine Video.

Plot
A growing number of cattle raids prompts the cattlemen to call on their cattlemen's association president Martin Lethbridge to investigate. Sheep Ranchers are suspected, who led by Gregg Randall blame the cattlemen for increased casualties among the sheep herds. Letherbridge falls in love with Randall's daughter, Dolly, and eventually exposes Blunt Vanier as the cause of the conflict.

Cast

 Edmund Cobb as Martin Lethbridge
 Frank Gallagher as Blunt Vanier 
 Clare Hatton as Gregg Randall  
 Roy Langdon as Bob Randall  
 Harry Ascher as Red Morriss  
 E. Glendower as Soapweed Harris  
 B. Bonaventure as Roddy, the sheriff  
 Levi Simpson as Wagner  
 Dolly Dale as Dolly  
 Helen M. Hayes as Inez  
 Mae Dean as Neil Barclay  
 Ann Drew as Mary Smithson

Crew
 Otis B. Thayer Managing Director
 Vernon L. Walker Head Cameraman
 H. Haller Murphy Cameraman
 William E. Smith Photography

References

External links
 

1923 films
1923 Western (genre) films
American black-and-white films
Films directed by Otis B. Thayer
 
Silent American Western (genre) films
Films shot in Colorado
1920s English-language films
1920s American films